Bathsheba "Bash" Doran is a British-born playwright and TV scriptwriter living in New York City.

Life
Bathsheba Doran, nicknamed "Bash", grew up in London and studied at Cambridge University. Her mother is the Elizabethan historian, Susan Doran.She became interested in comedy and writing early on. Doran says she fell in love with theatre when she found Peter Pan's shadow in the backstage at a theatre when she was a little girl and realised that it was made of pantyhose.

Doran was a contemporary of Robert Webb and David Mitchell. Her first job as a professional writer was comedy sketch writing for their BBC2 show Bruiser. She worked for several years in London as a comedy writer, writing for shows such as Smack the Pony and TV to Go.

In 2000, Doran moved to the United States on a Fulbright Scholarship. She studied and received a Master of Fine Arts from Columbia University in 2003, and was selected as a playwriting fellow at Juilliard School.

Doran's work has been developed by the O'Neill Playwriting Center, Lincoln Center, Manhattan Theatre Club and Sundance Theatre Lab, among others. She helped Lear deBessonet with her play transFigures. She has had plays commissioned by the Atlantic Theater Company and Playwrights Horizons.

Doran's play, Kin, described as "exquisitely wrought" by the New York Times, premiered at off-Broadway's Playwrights Horizons from 25 February – 3 April 2011, under the direction of Sam Gold.

Her play The Mystery of Love and Sex, directed by Sam Gold, opened at Lincoln Center in New York on 2 March 2015. It was described as "perfectly wonderful" by the New York Times.

The play was subsequently produced at the Mark Taper Forum in Los Angeles and the Signature Theater, Arlington VA, among other national and international venues.

Doran was nominated for a 2012 Writers Guild Award for her work on the HBO series Boardwalk Empire. She also wrote episodes for season 2 of the NBC show Smash. She was a writer and co-producer of season 2 of the Showtime show Masters of Sex. She was co-executive producer and writer of Hulu's adaptation of The Looming Tower.

She co-wrote the Netflix feature film Outlaw King, starring Chris Pine and directed by David Mackenzie.

She created and wrote the Channel 4 show Traitors (originally named Jerusalem).

She lives with her wife and two children in New York City.

Awards
 2013 winner of first annual Berwin Lee Playwright Awards
 2009 recipient of the Helen Merrill Playwriting Award
 Cherry Lane Mentor Project fellow
 2005–06 Susan Smith Blackburn Awards finalist
 Liberace Playwriting Fellowship
 Howard Stein Scholarship
 Three Lecomte de Nouy playwriting awards.

Works 
Feminine Wash, Edinburgh Festival Fringe
Until Morning, BBC Radio 4
The Blind, Classic Stage Company, 2005
Peer Gynt, Riverside Theatre
Great Expectations, Lucille Lortel Theatre, 2006
Living Room in Africa, 2006, Edge Theater, New York
Time / Unstuck, Red Room, NY, 2006
2 Soldiers: The Red Room, NY, 2006
Nest, Signature Theatre, 2007
 Nowhere in America, Keen Teens at The Kirk Theatre, 2008
The Parent's Evening, The Flea, 2010
Kin, Playwrights Horizons, 2011
The Mystery of Love and Sex, Lincoln Center for the Performing Arts, 2015

Television writing credits 
Bruiser
Smash (Season 2)
Boardwalk Empire (Season 2; two episodes)
Masters of Sex (Season 2; two episodes)
Traitors (Four episodes; also credited as series creator)
The Looming Tower (Two episodes)
Life After Life

Bibliography 

Living Room in Africa, Samuel French Ltd., 2008 
Nest, Samuel French, 2008 
Great Expectations, Playscripts, Inc., 2006

The Mystery of Love and Sex, Samuel French Ltd., 2015 
The Marriage Plays, Oberon Books, 2016

References

External links
Bathsheba Doran at Doollee.com
Nest review at Talkin' Broadway

British women dramatists and playwrights
Living people
Juilliard School alumni
Columbia University School of the Arts alumni
Year of birth missing (living people)
Writers from London
British LGBT dramatists and playwrights
British LGBT screenwriters
English lesbian writers
21st-century British dramatists and playwrights
British television writers
21st-century American women writers
American dramatists and playwrights
American women screenwriters
American women television writers
American television writers
21st-century American screenwriters
21st-century LGBT people
British women television writers